Survivor Srbija is the Serbian version of the reality television game show Survivor. Its first broadcast was on October 27, 2008. The show is broadcast by Prva.

In addition to Serbia, the show is broadcast in Croatia, Bosnia and Herzegovina, Macedonia, Slovenia and Montenegro. The fifth season has the subtitle Na putu do pob(j)ede (On the road to victory).

Broadcast

Seasons
So far four seasons have been filmed and broadcast, with a fifth (pan-regional) season currently airing.

The show has a set number of contestants stranded on an isolated area for 53 days in the first two seasons and 32 and 37 days in the third and the fourth seasons.

The winners received a prize of €100,000. In VIP season, the winner received a prize of €50,000.

Andrija Milošević was an only host from seasons 1 to 3, when Marijana Batinić joined him to host season 4 together. In February 2022, it was announced that Bojan Perić would host season 5.

Seasons overview

Contestants

References

External links 
 Official website
 Nova S

 
2008 Serbian television series debuts
Prva Srpska Televizija original programming